Jonathan Fenby CBE (born 11 November 1942) is a British analyst, author, historian and journalist.

In terms of his business career, he has served as the Chairperson of the China Team at the research service TSLombard. He was previously a founding partner and managing director of the China service at Trusted Sources an emerging markets research and consultancy firm headquartered in London before it merged with Lombard Street Research in 2016. His investment and strategy research is focused towards policy interpretation, politics and broader political economy including East Asian politics and strategy.

He has written many books, such as The General: Charles de Gaulle and the France He Saved and Chiang Kai-shek: China's Generalissimo and the Nation He Lost. He has also worked at various publications as both an editor and foreign correspondent, like The Observer and the South China Morning Post. In 2013, the government of France awarded Fenby the status of a Chevalier of the Légion d'honneur for his contributions promoting Anglo-French understanding.

Education
Fenby was educated at King Edward VI School, Birmingham and at Westminster School, an independent school for boys in central London, followed by New College at the University of Oxford.

Career
Fenby joined Reuters in 1963, and reported from Europe and Vietnam as well as working as an editor at the head office in London. He was Paris bureau chief from 1968 to 1973 before being appointed as Editor of the agency's World Service in 1973. After leaving Reuters in 1977, he joined The Economist where he was chief correspondent in both Paris and Bonn (1981-1986) and wrote three books. He then became the first home editor of The Independent (1986–1988) and then deputy editor of The Guardian (1988–1993), followed by the editorship of The Observer from 1993 to 1995 and then of the South China Morning Post from 1995 to 2000 during the return of Hong Kong to Chinese sovereignty.

After returning to London from Hong Kong in 2000, Fenby wrote extensively about China for British and other publications as well as working at various on-line services and as associate editor of the newspaper Sunday Business. In 2006, he was a founding partner at Trusted Sources in charge of the analytical service on China, which he visited frequently.

Between 1998 and 2019, he published 17 books, nine on China, four on France and others on the Second World War and the shaping of the world after 1945. He is quoted in press in the UK, US and Far East and broadcasts, as well as speaking at conferences and lecturing at universities and public forums on China.

Fenby was appointed a Commander of the Most Excellent Order of the British Empire (CBE) in the 2000 New Year Honours List for services to journalism, and was appointed a Knight of the French National Order of Merit in 1997, and then of the French Légion d'honneur. He is an Associate of the London School of Economics (LSE) and the School of Oriental and African Studies (SOAS), and is on the advisory board of the financial forum, OMFIF.

Personal life
He is married to Renée. He has 2 children, Alex and Sara, and 5 grandchildren, Alice, Max, Lola, Kate and Ella

Bibliography

Generalissimo: Chiang Kai-shek and the China He lost, Free Press, 2003. .
The Sinking of the Lancastria: Britain's Worst Naval Disaster and Churchill's Cover-up, Carroll & Graf, 2005. .

The Seventy Wonders of China, Thames & Hudson, 2007. 
Dragon Throne: the imperial dynasties of China (with Alexander Monro, Luke Hambledon), Quercus, 2008, 
The History of Modern China: The Fall and Rise of a Great Power, Penguin Press and Harper Collins, 2008. New Edition 2019 
The General: Charles de Gaulle and the France He Saved, Simon and Schuster, 2010. 
Tiger Head, Snake Tails: China today, how it got there and where it is heading, Simon & Schuster, 2012. 

Will China Dominate the 21st Century?, Polity, 2014 second edition 2016 

The History of Modern France, Simon & Schuster, 2015. 
 Crucible: The Year that Shaped Our World, Simon & Schuster, 2018

See also

List of foreign recipients of the Légion d'Honneur by decade

References

External links
Jonathan Fenby's China blog

Alumni of New College, Oxford
British newspaper editors
1942 births
Living people
People educated at Westminster School, London
The Observer people
Commanders of the Order of the British Empire
Chatham House people
People educated at King Edward's School, Birmingham
Reuters people
The Guardian people